Transient Lady is a 1935 American drama film directed by Edward Buzzell, written by Edward Buzzell, Arthur Caesar and Harvey F. Thew, and starring Gene Raymond, Henry Hull, Frances Drake, June Clayworth, Clark Williams and Edward Ellis. It was released on March 4, 1935, by Universal Pictures.

Plot
When Senator Baxter's brother is murdered, he tries to place the blame on an innocent man.

Cast 
Gene Raymond as Carey Marshall
Henry Hull as Sen. Hamp Baxter
Frances Drake as Dale Cameron
June Clayworth as Pat Warren
Clark Williams as Chris Blake
Edward Ellis as Nick Kiley
Frederick Burton as Major Marshall
Douglas Fowley as Matt Baxter
Helen Lowell as Matilda Branham
Clara Blandick as Eva Branham
Phillip Trent as Fred Baxter 
Al Bridge as Sheriff Angel Verner
Willard Robertson as Ed Goring
Eddie "Rochester" Anderson as 'Noxious' 
Johnny Taylor as 'Plato'

References

External links 
 

1935 films
1930s English-language films
American drama films
1935 drama films
Universal Pictures films
Films directed by Edward Buzzell
American black-and-white films
1930s American films